The Godavari Fourth Bridge or Kovvur–Rajahmundry 4th Bridge is built across Godavari River in Rajahmundry, India. This dual bridge connects Kovvur to Diwancheruvu Junction in Rajamahendravaram in via Katheru, Konthamuru, Palacherla areas in Rajamahendravaram City. This bridge was constructed, aimed to reduce road distance between Kolkata and Chennai by at least .

History 
The foundation stone for the bridge was laid in 2009 by then Chief Minister Y.S. Rajasekhara Reddy. 4th bridge was targeted for completed in 2012, but due to multiple delays it was opened to traffic in 2015. Due to delays the cost of bridge went up to Rs. 800 crore from the estimated Rs. 512 crore. This bridge was expected to ease traffic through Rajahmundry city but some multi-axle trucks are using the old route due to the narrow road connecting the bridge from Gundugolanu to Kovvur.

See also 
 Godavari Bridge
 Old Godavari Bridge
 Godavari Arch Bridge

References

External links 

 Greater Rajahmundry

Bridges in Andhra Pradesh
Bridges over the Godavari river
Road bridges in India
Transport in Rajahmundry
Buildings and structures in Rajahmundry
2015 establishments in Andhra Pradesh
Bridges completed in 2015